MRF or mrf may stand for:

Military
 Medical Response Force, the elite medical arm of the Singapore Armed Forces Medical Corps
 Military Reaction Force, a British military unit in Belfast
 Missouri Reserve Force, the official state defense force of Missouri, U.S.
 Mobile Riverine Force, a joint U.S. Army and U.S. Navy force in the Vietnam War
 Maritime Raid Force, a U.S. Marine Corps unit that conducts maritime boarding actions
 Mirage Rebuild Factory, part of the Pakistan Aeronautical Complex

Organizations and companies
 MRF (company), an Indian manufacturer of rubber products
 Fjord1 MRF, a Norwegian transportation company
 Morgellons Research Foundation, group focused on Morgellons, a form of delusional parasitosis
 Mountain River Films, a Nepalese independent film-production company
 Movement for Rights and Freedoms, a Bulgarian political party
 MRF Pace Foundation, a coaching clinic in India for training fast bowlers
 Myanmar Rice Federation, Burma's national organisation for the rice industry

Science
 Markov random field, in physics and probability, a random field that satisfies Markov properties
 Midbrain reticular formation, a structure in the midbrain
 Multiprogram Research Facility, at the Oak Ridge National Laboratory in Oak Ridge, Tennessee, U.S.
 Myelin gene Regulatory Factor, a protein critical to myelin
 Myelin Repair Foundation, an American non-profit medical research organization
 Myogenic regulatory factors, a group of proteins regulating myogenesis

Technology
 Magnetorheological finishing, a precision surface-finishing technology
 Magnetorheological fluid, a type of smart fluid in a carrier fluid
 Media Resource Function, a component of an IP Multimedia Subsystem
 Material Recovery Facility, a specialized plant that receives, separates and prepares recyclable materials for marketing to end-user manufacturers.

Transportation
 Marfa Airport, Marfa, Presidio County, Texas, U.S.
 Mauritanienne Air Fret's ICAO airline code
 Moorfields railway station, in Liverpool, England

Other uses
 Macomb Correctional Facility, a prison in New Haven, Macomb County, Michigan, U.S.
 Materials recovery facility, a specialized plant that processes recyclable materials
 Mississippi River Festival, a summer outdoor concert series from 1969 to 1980 in Illinois, U.S.
 Elseng language (ISO 639 code)
 Maldivian rufiyaa, currency of the Maldives

See also
 MRF Challenge, an open-wheel motorsport formula based in India